Ribbon farms (also known as strip farms, long-lot farms, or just long lots) are long, narrow land divisions for farming, usually lined up along a waterway.  In some instances, they line a road.

Background
Ribbon or strip farms were prevalent in diverse areas of the world along rivers; locations where these farms appear include in parts of Ireland, Central Europe (particularly in Germany and Poland), West Africa, Hokkaido, Brazil, and Chile.  In the United States and Canada, ribbon farms are found in various places settled by the French, particularly along the Saint Lawrence River, the Great Lakes, and the Detroit River and tributaries, and parts of Louisiana.  Some sections of the American Southwest, particularly Texas, also had ribbon farms laid out.

It is likely that platting farms in ribbon lots arose independently in various parts of the world.  However, the ribbon farms scattered through the United States probably derive from the European model.  The origin of the ribbon farm in Europe is unclear, but the first recorded appearance of these types of farms was in Germany in the ninth to eleventh century.  These early German long lots were cut through forests or marshes, rather than along rivers, allowing for clustering of houses along a central road.  From Germany, the pattern spread, notably to western France, where forest, marsh, and river long lots were well-established by the time the French began colonizing the Americas.  By the 1630s, the long-lot pattern had been imported to the New World and established along the St Lawrence Seaway as the French seigneurial system.  From there, the ribbon farm plan situated along rivers was carried to other parts of the French colonies, and diffused into some parts of the Spanish colonies.

Description

The size of ribbon farms can vary from lot to lot and from place to place.

Farmers of ribbon farms typically, although not universally, built houses on the farm along the river such that the houses on a series of ribbon farms were located near each other.

Advantages
In areas where rivers provided the main form of transportation, the ribbon farm layout gave multiple landowners access to the waterway.  In addition, the long lots increased variation in soil and drainage within one lot, and facilitated plowing by minimizing the number of times oxen teams needed to be turned.  Where farmers lived on their lots (rather than in a central village), the ribbon farm fostered communication and socialization, with houses clustered at the ends of the lots.  The ribbon farm also strikes an economic balance, where houses are relatively close together and can be easily and economically accessed, yet the farmers need not spend excessive travel time to reach their fields some distance from a central village.  Finally, in those places in the New World where ribbon farms were platted, the division of land into long rectangles was relatively easy to survey and establish boundaries.

Disadvantage
One disadvantage was that the agricultural land of a single farmer was awkwardly spread out, often over two or more linear miles, necessitating a long travel time to reach rear parts of the lot.  However, this disadvantage was generally no more than would have been experienced by peasant farmers living in a central village and walking to their fields.

See also
Open field system
Seigneurial system of New France
Strip farming
Strip farming in Norway
Linear settlement

References

Types of farms
Surveying
Agricultural land